Satisfaction Is the Death of Desire is the debut studio album by American metalcore band Hatebreed. It was released on November 11, 1997, through Victory Records. This was the band's breakthrough album, with the majority of critics praising it, even calling it a "hardcore classic". It lifted them out from the underground scene and thanks to this rise in fame they got a record deal with Universal Records.

Track listing 

Some original pressings of the record have the last track incorrectly titled "Dirven by Suffering".

Pressing information 
Hatebreed – Satisfaction – Blue Vinyl 510 copies, Black Vinyl, Red Vinyl 506 copies, White Vinyl 509 copies, Clear Vinyl 510 copies, Purple Vinyl 665 copies, Green Vinyl 660 copies, and Pink Vinyl  210 copies.

Personnel 
Jamey Jasta – vocals
Lou "Boulder" Richards – rhythm guitar
Chris Beattie – bass guitar
Jamie Pushbutton – drums
Matt McIntosh – lead guitar

Production
Sean Bonner – construction
Jesse Burke – photography
Alan Douches – mastering
Steve Evetts – producer, engineer
Jamie Murphy – photography
Adam Tanner – photography

References 

Hatebreed albums
1997 debut albums
Victory Records albums
Albums produced by Steve Evetts